Kise Mill Bridge is a historic camelback stone arch bridge in Newberry Township, York County, Pennsylvania.  It was built in 1915, and measures about  overall. The rubble masonry bridge crosses Bennett Run.

It was added to the National Register of Historic Places in 1988.  It is located in the Kise Mill Bridge Historic District.

In 2014, the bridge was repaired from so many years of use. Due to its historical significance, it could not be replaced. The project took nearly 3 years to complete, and because of it the historical landmark will be fully functional for decades to come.

Gallery

References

Road bridges on the National Register of Historic Places in Pennsylvania
Bridges completed in 1915
Bridges in York County, Pennsylvania
National Register of Historic Places in York County, Pennsylvania
Stone arch bridges in the United States